Daniel Onyekachi (born 24 August 1985 in Port Harcourt) is a Nigerian footballer who currently plays for Elana Toruń in the Polish Second League.

References
 

1985 births
Living people
Nigerian footballers
GKS Katowice players
Zdrój Ciechocinek players
Górnik Wieliczka players
Kmita Zabierzów players
Elana Toruń players
Association football forwards
Expatriate footballers in Poland
Nigerian expatriate sportspeople in Poland
Nigerian expatriate footballers
Sportspeople from Port Harcourt